Giddarbaha, is a town and a municipal council in Muktsar district, in the Indian state of Punjab. It lies on NH-7, which connects Fazilka (Punjab) to Mana (Uttarakhand) in India.

History
Giddarbaha in its earliest stage was known as 'Pepali', named after the old tree 'pipal'. Giddarbaha, means Pepali of that time, was a small village. It was very happy and small village with limited number of people. When Shri Guru Gobind Singh ji visited Pepali, they saw ladies of the village disturbed by the 'giddar' when they went to fetch water from the well. When Guru ji saw this, he inquired about the problem to which the villagers replied that everybody in this village is married except him (giddar). After knowing the problem, Guruji arranged the marriage of giddar. From there that village was renamed by the locals as 'Giddar vivaha'. It is educationally very advanced.

It is famous for snuff factories. It surpasses many cities in cleanest sewer system, broad roads etc. It has an impressive railway station and platform. During that time, it took the shape of a town from the small village and when the Britishers reached here they wrongly pronounced the town name as Giddarbaha. They planned a new walled city in 1909 with six gates and carved the name on the gates as Giddarbaha. From there people accepted the name and started pronouncing the same.

In 1917, the British government established the Bathinda - Karachi railway line, to transport the goods from this part of India to Karachi. Giddarbaha Railway Station was established on the line in 1918 which divided the old and new city. The railway station was established near the clock house gate and is very close to the bus stand.

Geography
Giddarbaha is located in the south-western zone of Punjab. The district of Faridkot lies to its North, Firozepur to the West and Bathinda to the East. It is well connected by rail and road networks. National Highway NH-15 connects Giddarbaha to Bathinda. Through Bathinda, Giddarbaha is connected to various Indian cities via railways as well.

Climate
There is wide seasonal temperature variation in the region, with summer temperatures reaching a maximum of 48-50 °C and winter temperatures down to a minimum of 1-2 °C. The western Himalayas in the north and the Thar Desert in the south and southwest mainly determine the climatic conditions. The southwestern monsoon brings the rainy season during summer (July to September), with nearly 70% of the region's annual rainfall occurring during those months. Giddarbaha's sewage system beats the same of some big Indian cities.

The major part of the district experiences an aridic (tropical) moisture regime. It is 19 km away from Malout city.

Religion
The majority of Giddarbaha population follows Hinduism, followed closely by Sikhism. One can find many mandir, gurudwaras, mosques, and churches in and around the city. Dera Baba Gangaram, Jai Maa Mahakali Mandir (Railway Road) and Theri village Gurdwara (Giddarbaha) are famous in the region. Gurdwara Guptsar Sahib in Chhattiana village is a famous Sikh gurdwara in Giddarbaha division.

Demographics
Home State Census 2011 District List Muktsar Gidderbaha Gidderbaha Municipal Council

Gidderbaha Population Census 2011 - 2022
About Gidderbaha
Caste Factor
Work Profile
2022 Gidderbaha
Overview
Gidderbaha is a Municipal Council city in district of Muktsar, Punjab. The Gidderbaha city is divided into 17 wards for which elections are held every 5 years. The Gidderbaha Municipal Council has population of 45,370 of which 23,847 are males while 21,523 are females as per report released by Census India 2011.
Population of Children with age of 0-6 is 5285 which is 11.65% of total population of Gidderbaha (M Cl). In Gidderbaha Municipal Council, Female Sex Ratio is of 903 against state average of 895. Moreover, Child Sex Ratio in Gidderbaha is around 861, compared to Punjab state average of 846. Literacy rate of Gidderbaha city is 75.15% lower than state average of 75.84%. In Gidderbaha, Male literacy is around 80.70% while female literacy rate is 69.04%.

Gidderbaha Municipal Council has total administration over 8,892 houses to which it supplies basic amenities like water and sewerage. It is also authorize to build roads within Municipal Council limits and impose taxes on properties coming under its jurisdiction.

Gidderbaha Religion Data 2011
Town	Population
Hindu- 64.34%
Sikh- 33.42%
Muslim-0.70%
Christian- 0.27%
Buddhist- 0.07%
Jain- 0.64%
Others Not Stated- 0.12%

Education

Schools
 Govt. Boys School.
 Govt. Girls School.
 Malwa School.
 JNJ DAV Public School.
 S. City Montessori School
 DAV Vaish School.
 Vardhman school
 MMD DAV COLLEGE.
 Skylight Education classes
 Heritage public sen sec school
Keshav Vidya Mandir Sen. Sec. School
 Aryan public school
 Bachpan play school
 Sri Guru Gobind Singh College

Colleges
The town has three degree colleges as well.
Mata Misri Devi DAV College
Guru Gobind Singh Girls' College
Mata Sahib Kaur Nursing Institute
Government College, Gidderbaha

Places of interest
Jai Maa mahakali Mandir Near Railway Station
Gurdwara Dasvin Patshah [Guru Gobind Singh Sahib]
 Gurudwara Nanaksar sahib [bantabaad mohalla] 
Shree Durga Mandir
Dera Baba Shree Ganga Ram Ji
Satgur Ravidas Mandir
Gurudwara Sri Amardass ji (Mandi Wala) Gurudwara Sahib
Shree Gaushalla Mandir
Aggarwal Peerkhana
Hanuman Mandir Bantabad
Hanuman Mandir Subhash Nagar
Baba vishvakarma gurudwara
Freedom Fighter Comrade Chiranji Lal Dhir Municipal Park
Sh Gurdev Singh Maan Memorial Municipal Park 
Clock House
City Club
Basketball Stadium (Baba Ganga Ram Stadium)
 Guru Gobind Singh Bagh
 Biodiversity park Gidderbaha
 Siddhidatri Dham

City Gates
Clock house gate (Main)
City gate
Husnar gate
Bharu gate
Theri gate
Daula gate

Banks
 Central Bank Of India
 ICICI BANK LIMITED
 Oriental Bank Of Commerce 
 Punjab National Bank.
Axis Bank
Allahabad Bank
State Bank of India
Uco bank
 HDFC Bank
 Ujiwan Finance Bank
 State Bank of India

Further afield
Jai Maa Mahakali Mandir, established in 1982 Near Giddarbaha Railway Station. 
The Gurudwara Sri Sahib at Theri Sahib, where Sri Guru Gobind Singh is believed to have rested for the night,  from Giddarbaha
The old Dera of Baba Ganga Ram ji, near Husnar village, 
The religious Sarovar of Kulguru, in Husnar village, 
The old church in Daula village, 
Mandi Wali Nehar, 
Dera Baba Lang, 
Badal village, 
Gurdwara Guptsar Sahib in Chhattiana village,

Economy
Giddarbaha is one of the largest producers of snuff and Naswar in India. Several brands of snuff claim to have originated there, including 5 Photo, Six Photo, and 7 Photo snuff. The Six Photo Snuff Factory remains in Giddarbaha.
The city also acts as an agricultural market serving surrounding towns and villages.

Notable people from Giddarbaha
Giddarbaha is famous for producing Sardar (leaders) and Kalaakar (singers). Some of them are listed as:

【Thekedar Lala Deen Dayal Jaiswal】(Abkari) 1909-1968
Manpreet Singh Badal, Member of Legislative Assembly and Finance Minister of Punjab.
Parkash Singh Badal, former Chief Minister of Punjab 
Sukhbir Singh Badal, former Deputy Chief minister of Punjab 
Vijay K. Dhir, former Dean of Engineering, University of California, Los Angeles
Jaani, popular music writer
Gurdas Mann, popular Punjabi singer
Ashok Masti, popular Punjabi singer 
Mehar Mittal, popular comedian in Punjabi movies 
Hakam Sufi, Punjabi Singer
Amrinder Singh Raja Warring, All India President of Indian Youth Congress and MLA of Giddarbaha.
Gyan Chand Jain (Padamshri for spreading IT Education) - BPB Publications

External links
 Giddarbaha City info website

References

Sri Muktsar Sahib
Cities and towns in Sri Muktsar Sahib district
Villages in Sri Muktsar Sahib district